Bloomeria crocea, also known as goldenstar, is a geophyte  from southern California and northern Baja California. It is found along hillsides, in grassland and chaparral edges, and in dry flats.

Description
The corms of Bloomeria crocea have a fibrous exterior and usually produces only one leaf.  Plants produce six-petaled golden flowers that are clustered in a loose umbel.  When the three-lobed stigma is fertilized, Bloomeria produces capsules that contain small black seeds.  The seeds then require three to four years to become a mature plant.

Distribution
Growing in full sun, Bloomeria crocea prefers porous soil and semi-dry conditions, in the Peninsular, Transverse, and southern California Coast Ranges, and on the Channel Islands. Its distribution is found along the southern coast from Santa Barbara County and western Kern County, through Southern California, down into Baja California.

Varieties
Three varieties are currently recognised:
B. crocea var. aurea
B. crocea var. crocea
B. crocea var. montana

References

Growing California Native Plants. 1980.  Marjorie G. Schmidt.
"The  Jepson Manual," Jepson Flora Project, Jepson Interchange.  Copyright © 1993 by the Regents of the University of California [web application]. Treatment at: http://ucjeps.berkeley.edu/cgi-bin/get_JM_treatment.pl?8349,8435,8436
USDA, NRCS. 2006. The PLANTS Database, Version 3.5 (http://plants.usda.gov). Data compiled from various sources by Mark W. Skinner. National Plant Data Center, Baton Rouge, LA 70874-4490 USA.

External links

 Jepson Manual Treatment - Bloomeria crocea
USDA: Bloomeria crocea
Bloomeria crocea - Photo Gallery

crocea
Flora of California
Flora of Baja California
Natural history of the California Coast Ranges
Natural history of the Peninsular Ranges
Natural history of the Santa Monica Mountains
Taxa named by John Torrey
Flora without expected TNC conservation status